Mohammad Naeimipour is an Iranian engineer and reformist politician who served a member of the Parliament of Iran from 2000 to 2004 representing Tehran, Rey, Shemiranat and Eslamshahr.

A student of Sharif University of Technology, Naeimipour was among the Muslim Student Followers of the Imam's Line during the Hostage Crisis and later served in the Ministry of Culture and Islamic Guidance under Mohammad Khatami. He was founder of Yas-e No newspaper.

References

1955 births
Living people
Members of the 6th Islamic Consultative Assembly
Deputies of Tehran, Rey, Shemiranat and Eslamshahr
Islamic Iran Participation Front politicians
Muslim Student Followers of the Imam's Line
Sharif University of Technology alumni
Union of Islamic Iran People Party politicians